Redding School District is one of the many school districts in Redding, California. It includes a total of ten school sites: four TK-5th grade, three TK-8th grade, one 6-8th grade, and two K-8th homeschools. Redding School District covers a large portion of Redding's westside. Robert Adams is currently the superintendent.

The Redding School District includes the following schools:

Bonny View Elementary School
Cypress Elementary School
Manzanita Elementary School
Sycamore Elementary School

TK-8th Grade:
Juniper Elementary School
Redding Achieve
Turtle Bay School

6th-8th Grade:
Sequoia Middle School

K-8th Homeschool:
College Prep Academy
Stellar Charter School

References

External links
 

School districts in Shasta County, California